Vladimir Borisovich Rushailo (born July 28, 1953 in Morshansk, Tambov Oblast) is a Russian politician.

While Rushailo was Moscow City Police General of the Moscow RUOP, he was in open conflict with Georgian mob boss 
Otari Kvantrishvili.

From 1999 to 2001, he was the interior minister of Russia, and secretary of Security Council from 2001 to 2004. As the minister of the interior, he was charged with overseeing the security of sensitive internal sites and materials such as high-value train shipments and nuclear weapons facilities. His tenure coincided with a period of serious concern over the security of Russia's nuclear weapons stocks, especially with regard to the 2000 computer bug and its potential effects in the run up to and after the Y2K switch.
From 14 July 2004 to 5 October 2007, he was the executive secretary of the Commonwealth of Independent States.
In 2002, he was injured in a road crash in Kamchatka together with region's governor Mikhail Mashkovtsev.

Honours and awards
Hero of the Russian Federation (October 27, 1999)
Order of Merit for the Fatherland, 3rd class (2003)
Order of Courage (1998)
Order of Honour (1998)
Order of the Badge of Honour (1986)
Order for Personal Courage (1992)
Jubilee Medal "300 Years of the Russian Navy" (1996)
Medal "In Commemoration of the 850th Anniversary of Moscow"
Medal "In Commemoration of the 300th Anniversary of Saint Petersburg" (2003)
Order of Holy Prince Daniel of Moscow, 3rd class (Russian Orthodox Church)

References

1953 births
Living people
People from Morshansk
Interior ministers of Russia
Heroes of the Russian Federation
Recipients of the Order "For Merit to the Fatherland", 3rd class
Recipients of the Order of Courage
Recipients of the Order of Honour (Russia)
Recipients of the Order "For Personal Courage"
Recipients of the Order of Holy Prince Daniel of Moscow
Commonwealth of Independent States people
Members of the Federation Council of Russia (after 2000)